Kazimierz Moskal may refer to:

Kazimierz Moskal (footballer) (born 1967), Polish footballer
Kazimierz Moskal (politician) (born 1962), Polish politician